The Maison du Figaro is a historic building in the 1st arrondissement of Marseille in France. It was designed by architect Pierre Pavillon, and it was completed in 1675. It has been listed as an official historical monument since 1992.

References

Houses completed in 1675
Monuments historiques of Marseille
1675 establishments in France